The 2012 Cornell Big Red football team represented Cornell University in the 2012 NCAA Division I FCS football season as a member of the Ivy League. They were led by third-year head coach Kent Austin and played their home games at Schoellkopf Field. Cornell finished the season 4–6 overall and 2–5 in Ivy League play to tie for sixth.

Schedule

References

Cornell
Cornell Big Red football seasons
Cornell Football